George Soros (born 1930) is a business magnate, investor, and philanthropist.

Soros may also refer to:

People
 Alexander Soros (born 1985), son of George Soros, philanthropist
Daisy Soros (born 1929), wife of Paul Soros, philanthropist and supporter of the arts
 Jonathan Soros (born 1970), son of George Soros, founder and chief executive officer of JS Capital Management LLC
 Paul Soros (1926–2013), brother of George Soros, and Henry Laurence Gantt Medal winner
 Susan Weber Soros (born 1954), founder and director of the Bard Graduate Center
 Tivadar Soros (1894–1968), Esperanto writer, father of George Soros

Other uses
 Soros Fund Management, a financial services company founded by George Soros
 Soros Foundation, a network of national foundations which fund volunteer socio-political activity created by George Soros
 Soros: The Life, Times, and Trading Secrets of the World's Greatest Investor, 1996 biography of George Soros by Robert Slater
 Soros (Echinades)

Surnames of Hungarian origin